Men in Her Life is a 1962 painting by Andy Warhol. It is a black and white painting inspired by the life of Elizabeth Taylor, a seven foot tall creation of the artist.

Painting style
It is a series of photos picturing the most important men in the life of Elizabeth Taylor, including her third husband Mike Todd and her future husband Eddie Fisher.

History and price
The painting was sold for $63,362,500 in 2010 by Phillips de Pury & Co. The final sum was a surprise even for the organizers, which evaluated the painting at 40 million dollars initially. The name of the buyer was not disclosed to the public - though it has been reported to be Sheikh Hamad bin Khalifa Al-Thani.

See also
List of most expensive paintings

References

Paintings by Andy Warhol
1962 paintings
Cultural depictions of Elizabeth Taylor